Richard Howard Hilton (born August 17, 1955) is an American businessman. He is the chairman and co-founder of Hilton & Hyland, a real estate brokerage firm based in Beverly Hills, California, that specializes in homes and estates in Beverly Hills, Holmby Hills, Bel-Air, Brentwood, Pacific Palisades, Malibu, Hollywood Hills, as well as estates from Santa Barbara to San Diego.

Biography

Early life
Hilton was born in Los Angeles, California, the sixth of eight children to Marilyn June (née Hawley) and Barron Hilton, whose father was Hilton Hotel founder Conrad Hilton. In 1978, he graduated from the University of Denver with a degree in hotel and restaurant management. His siblings are: William Barron Hilton Jr. (born 1948), Hawley Anne Hilton (born 1949), Steven Michael Hilton (born 1950), David Alan Hilton (born 1952), Sharon Constance Hilton (born 1953), Daniel Kevin Hilton (born 1962), and Ronald Jeffrey Hilton (born 1963).

Career
Hilton joined the New York office of Eastdil Secured, a real estate investment banking firm. He specialized in securing participation of institutional investors and pension funds in various transactions.

In 1984, he formed Hilton Realty Investment to handle commercial real estate. He obtained his broker license on November 29, 1985. Hilton and Jeffrey Hyland were issued a corporation license for their real estate firm Hilton & Hyland on July 26, 1993. Among their developments are Brentwood Country Estates. Former Million Dollar Listing cast members Chad Rogers and Josh Altman; Frank Robinson's daughter, Nichelle; Ron Kass's son, Robert; Anne Heche's former husband, Coleman Laffoon; Rayni Romito Williams and Branden Brent Williams, Richard D. Zanuck's daughter-in-law, Marisa, are among Hilton & Hyland's 106 salespeople.  In 2012, Hilton & Hyland reported almost $3.5 billion in sales Since 2006, Williams & Williams has been affiliated with the Hilton & Hyland Real Estate Inc. Both companies joined forces to develop and distribute projects in the highly competitive real estate luxury market.

Personal life
Hilton married Kathy Avanzino on November 24, 1979 when he was 24 years old and she was 20 years old. They have four children:  
 Paris Hilton (born February 17, 1981)
 Nicky Hilton (born October 5, 1983)
 Barron Hilton II (born November 7, 1989), who married Tessa von Walderdorff
 Conrad Hughes Hilton (born March 3, 1994)

They live in Bel Air, Los Angeles. Hilton has six grandchildren, one by Paris, three by Nicky and two by Barron.

References

External links
Instagram*
Hilton International
Hilton & Hyland

1955 births
Living people
American hoteliers
American real estate businesspeople
American socialites
Businesspeople from Los Angeles
Conrad Hilton family
People from Bel Air, Los Angeles
University of Denver alumni